Gabriele Magni (born 3 December 1973) is an Italian former fencer. He won a bronze medal in the team foil event at the 2000 Summer Olympics.

References

External links
 

1973 births
Living people
Italian male fencers
Olympic fencers of Italy
Fencers at the 2000 Summer Olympics
Olympic bronze medalists for Italy
Olympic medalists in fencing
People from Pistoia
Medalists at the 2000 Summer Olympics
Fencers of Fiamme Oro
Sportspeople from the Province of Pistoia